Acantholichen sorediatus is a species of basidiolichen in the family Hygrophoraceae. Found in Costa Rica, it was formally described as a new species in 2016 by Manuela Dal-Forno, Harrie Sipman, and Robert Lücking. Here, in the undergrowth of a disturbed primary forest, it was found growing on a tree trunk along with other lichens, including Hypotrachyna, Normandina, and Leptogium. The specific epithet refers to the soredia, found along the margins of the squamules.

References

Hygrophoraceae
Lichen species
Lichens described in 2016
Lichens of Central America
Taxa named by Robert Lücking
Basidiolichens
Taxa named by Harrie Sipman